Mobile business development is a category of business development which focuses on attracting new customers in the Mobile Web markets. There are large efforts being made to make innovative mobile ICT services work. Examples of these services include mobile tourist guides and shopping guides for potential consumers. As an emerging trend, technology and service providers combine their expertise and resources to design these services. This incorporates designing several models: the Value network, a Value proposition, a Revenue model and a Technological architecture.

Economic value
Together contributors need to create a business model that forms the blueprint of the cooperating network of organisations intends to create economic value from technological innovation. Therefore, it is useful to define the different relevant issues: Customer Value of services, Organizational arrangements, Technological architecture, and possible financial arrangements.

A business model is:

 An architecture for the product, service and information flows, including a description of the various business actors and their roles.
 A description of the potential benefits for the various business actors.
 A description of the sources of revenues.

Collaboration engineering
To facilitate the collaboration between the contributors, the methods can be used to act as a guideline for successful innovation during the pre-product phase. Most methods are based on the innovation prototyping method (3), which emphasizes on the balance between different viewpoints.

Mobile business is a communication process, which is based on technology, using software along with electronic assets to be used in different locations. Although this is a relatively new industry, it’s experiencing rapid technological advancements, such as audio and video features, as well as on-screen drawing capabilities, which are transmitted over (secure) networks and enable real time conferences, with possibility of multi-party attendance. These real time conferences are achieved through the use of cellular, wireless and broadband technology, which are not subject to location to work. The mobile technological advancements have enabled the video conferences to be taken beyond the limits of offices, boardrooms, lecture rooms etc. and prove a real collaboration between business and mobile. 
Mobile business includes a large number of elements, which undergo big advancements and changes every year, and provide us with countless options to disburden our lives. Some of those elements were already mentioned before (audio, video, telestration – on-screen drawing), with addition of collaboration tools, mobility, telepresence systems and transmission technologies. In present times (especially during the pandemic), the video mobile data traffic is well over two thirds. The most important drivers of mobile business use are remote worker and mobility.

Value for business
When using technology in order to be more competitive, the use of mobile adaptation strategy presents a totally new view of the business in today’s world. In fact, not using mobile technology, could drop ones competitive strength completely. The mobile business not only makes individual employees more efficient, but it can also improve the workflow of entire company. 
For the employees on the field, the use of mobile devices for business purposes means that they can capture and share the data instantly. The business processes and projects can be kept up to date continuously and thoroughly, which results in quick and smooth process. 
In order to make sure the mobile business collaboration is successful, firstly, the (mobile) process improvement has to be well thought out, without any disruptions on the corporate culture level. This means that the mobile platform (which business intends to use) is simple enough for all employees to use (their technical skills have to be taken under consideration), as well as containing the ability to cater to all of the necessary business needs. Another point to be considered is to not only look at the text side of things, but employ video and image capturing techniques as well. With this point under consideration, the organization will be able to share their data instantly with its members, which means that actions can be taken as soon as the data is captured. The third important thing in mobile business collaboration, is to define the results to which the business strives, before the implementation of mobile platform. By doing so, the business can measure whether the mobile implementation was a success or not, and by how much it contributes to business (money and time wise). And lastly, the compatibility has to be ensured for cross-devices. People use either iOS or Android devices, and the mobile platform shouldn’t only be limited to one of those operating systems, because broader adaptations are often the ones that lead to success. If all the above-mentioned points are put under consideration, the business can achieve a frictionless and bottle-neckless mobile business collaboration.

Concepts

Organizational arrangements
The relative large amount of contributing organisations in innovative ICT services has been the cause of important changes that took place in the value chain of these services.
Traditionally, one company would perform all necessary activities that make the service work. Nowadays, this is often divided between specialized contributors. This invokes the creation of and ad hoc value net, which replaces the more traditional value chain. In this value web there is less hierarchy and it is more adaptable to changes in roles or contributors. There are also no restrictions on the flow of data between the value net, instead it can flow in all directions all the time.

The following definition of a value net can be found in the book "Value Nets: Breaking the Supply Chain to unlock hidden profits", by David Bovet and Joseph Martha, John Wiley & Sons, Inc, 2000:

A value net is a business design that uses digital supply chains to achieve both superior customer satisfaction and company profitability. It is a fast, flexible system that is aligned with and driven by new customer choice mechanisms. A value net is not what the term supply chain conjures up. It is no longer just about supply, but it is also about creating value for customers, the company and its suppliers.

The value net differs from the traditional value chain in the sense that it is not a sequential, rigid chain. Instead, it is a dynamic, high performance network of customer/supplier partnerships and information flows.

Customer value of services
The Value Proposition model is used to represent the value of the service from the perspective of the end-user (Customer, Consumer). This model is often surprisingly complex for the design of mobile ICT services. This is because the characteristics are very different from physical products. The SHIP-acronym can be used to define four important characteristics of mobile ICT services (3):

 Simultaneously produced and consumed. This mean that the end-user is part of the production of content, and that the producer is also present during the transaction.
 Heterogeneous. This means that there is a (almost) unique instance of the service made for each end-user.
 Intangible. Although the service is intangible, they are often coupled to physical products.
 Perishable. The value of the service disappears after consumption by the end-user.

A value proposition model incorporates the consequences of these characteristics into the development process. This model can be in the form of a textual/graphic model, or even a demonstration version of the proposed service. The composition of the Value Proposition forces the designers to think about different important characteristics of mobile ICT services, the FBBM method addresses the following issues in this context 10:

 Context in which the service will operate, e.g., in a ‘shopping mall’, or at the ‘office’.
 The proposed target group, e.g., ‘museum visitors’, or ‘travelling business people’.
 Added value in comparison of existing services, ‘easier to use’, or ‘gives more information’.
 Estimation of its use, e.g., ‘how often will consumers use it?’, and ‘what does it mean to the user?’.

The information about service-characteristics that are gathered in this part of the Method is usually sketched in use-cases diagrams. This illustrates the part how the proposed services would interact with the end-user.

Financial arrangements
A Revenue model is used to identify all cash flows concerning the service. These are all costs and revenues that are the result of economic activities. Therefore, the value of each activity must be measured (or approximated) using performance indicators. In the model, the cash flows can be described qualitative at first (high, medium, low) and more in detail at later stages of the development process. The model uses lines representing in- and outgoing cash flows between the value activities and the actors drawn the model. The meta-model consists of the financial arrangements, which describe the costs and the revenues of a service, using performance indicators.

Technology architecture
The Technology Architecture model is used to give an overview of the technical functions, and infrastructure needed to provide the service. It associates application components from application architecture with technology components representing software and hardware components. The components are assembled and configured to constitute the enterprise’s technological infrastructure. Technology architecture provides a more concrete view of the way in which application components will be realized and deployed. For example, the way information is stored, or content is generated and broadcast. 
Technology architecture provides a more precise means of evaluating responses to constraints, notably by estimating hardware and network sizing needs or by setting up server or storage redundancy. It also ensures the delivered application components work together, confirming that the required business integration is supported.

Technique

The meta model
After exploring possible or desired Customer value of services model, Organizational arrangements model, financial arrangements Model and Technological Architecture model, are finalized.
This means that they take on their concrete form by actual companies and organizations. This means that the contributing organizations have to fill-in their positions in the value net and decide and negotiate the various design choices for the models.

A good mobile business development method should have a metadata model can be similar to the meta models below.

The outcome, in the form of a business model can be used to communicate an innovative ICT project outline to investors/participants. It describes the proposed value chain in great detail, because it consists of an overview of the sub models (Customer Value of services, Organisational arrangements, Financial arrangements and Technological architecture) that are balanced. In the total scope of the development of an innovative IT service, a business plan is very helpful in the decision process within the organisations of the participants.

Situational method engineering
Methods can be designed with the use of Situational method engineering. Situational method engineering can be described as the creation of an ad hoc method from fragments (method fragments) from known methods. This enables the creation of development methods to be me suitable for any development situation.

In case of mobile business development, there are methods available for specific parts of the business model design process and ICT development. Situational method engineering can be used to combine these methods into one unified method that adopts the characteristics of mobile ICT services.

The method fragments frequently used in mobile development are (6):

Quality Function Deployment — Quality function deployment (QFD) is a structured methodology that incorporates mathematical tools used to identify and quantify customers' requirements and translates them into key critical parameters. For a complete description of the QFD method, see this page in Wikipedia.
Brainstorm Techniques — The FBBM method uses some brainstorm techniques known for a long time in application development. They are used in development sessions.
Financial Analysis — The methods incorporated in financial analysis are targeted at calculating the prospects of a firm. By including financial analysis methods in a method, business can calculate important factors like the consumer-price of their services and their Return on Investment (ROI) beforehand.

Benefits of mobile business development

In today’s world, mobile devices are becoming more and more important. Developing mobile business can therefore prove to be extremely beneficial aspect of one’s business. Firstly, mobile devices allow greater mobility and accessibility of large amounts of data and are being used on daily basis by a vast majority of population. Through mobile devices, businesses thus gain quicker access to a larger number of potential consumers. Developing mobile business can therefore help a business to increase its brand awareness and overall recognition. Businesses can also develop mobile business to better cultivate customer loyalty as this is extremely important. The use of mobile application can also prove to be extremely beneficial as it can be utilized as a direct marketing channel. Mobile applications do provide numerous functions; they can provide general info, prices, booking forms, search features, user accounts, messengers, news feeds and much more. Furthermore, mobile business gives your targeted audience another way to reach and contact you. Lastly, it can greatly improve customer engagement and attract new customers as it does make certain parts of your services easier and less-time consuming for the potential customer. For example, instead of calling a restaurant to make a reservation, booking a table through a mobile app would make the whole process quicker and would require less effort from users, which are nowadays constantly seeking instant gratification.

Examples

Shopping mall
Shop owners in all large shopping mall have a plan to enrich the shopping experience in their mall. They want to develop a wireless application to be used on smart phones or on PDAs, which will be made available for rent at the entrance. The application will have an informative and an entertainment component. This way, the shop owners hope that they will create added value for their customers and improve their competitiveness.

Because there are many contributors to the development of the application (shop owners, (wireless) network provider, hardware provider), the business model is very complex in this case.

The contributors have composed their interpretation of the Value Proposition, the Value Network, the Revenue model and the Technological architecture in a first quick scan. At several more sessions during the pre-product development stage, these work models were compared and balanced. This process then was repeated until all contributors are satisfied with the resulting business model. The end result is a thought through, and working innovative application that is slowly starting to generate more sales for the participants.

Museum
The museum of modern arts has become inspired by other museums to use modern technology to guide its visitors through the museum. It plans to develop a wireless application that runs on museum owned pda's that are lent out to visitors at the entrance. The application uses gps to determine the position of the visitor and streaming video and audio to take on the role as museum guide.

The museum board has demanded the creation of a solid business model. The business model will be the basis for future decisions about the project and to explain the project to the museums donators.

The museum has found a partner for its project, a wireless Internet provider (WISP) will provide the network and hardware for the application. The WISP can use the museum for promotional activities in return.

Together they have composed their interpretation of the Value Proposition, the Value Network, the Revenue model and the Technological architecture in a first quick scan. At several more sessions during the pre-product development stage, these work models were compared and balanced. This process then was repeated until both contributors are satisfied with the resulting business model. The end result is a rich media application that is beneficial to the visitors experience and a clear display of wireless capability for future clients of the WISP.

References

Scientific papers
 From Idea to Business Blueprint, Timber Haaker & Marc Steen, January 2003, Telematics Institute.
 Learning about the Business Blueprint in the Dolmen Sessions, Timber Haaker & Marc Steen, February 2003, Telematics institute
 Designing Mobile information services:User requirements elicitation with GSS design and application of a repeatable process, Mariëlle den Hengst, Elisabeth van de Kar, Jaco Appelman, Delft University of Technology, Hawaii International Conference on System Sciences, 2004.
 Brokering Based Balancing of viewpoints — Experience from pre-product development of mobile services, Mervi Ranta and Henrik Asplund, PM&RG, Dept. of Computer science and Development, Helsinki University of Technology (News 2003)

Articles
 From Idea to successful collaboration (Dutch), Timber Haaker, Henry de Vos & Mark Steen, Management & Organisation, September/October 2004
 Successful innovation aided by business models (Dutch), Timber Haaker, 2004

Journals
 Ercim News, European Research Consortium for Informatics and Mathematics, July 2003

Books
 Value Nets, Breaking the supply chain to unlock hidden profits, David Bovet, Joseph Martha, Mercer Management Consulting, 2000, John Wiley & Sons Inc.
 Freeband Business Blueprint Method, Manual, Timber Haaker, Karin Oerlemans, Marc Steen, Henry de Vos, January 2004, Telematics Institute.

Reference websites
 Business Models for Electronic Markets, Paul Timmers, April 1998 
 Freeband Essentials(Archived page)  and Freeband B4U Project(Archived Page) 

Business models
Information technology management